Raahe sub-region is a subdivision of Northern Ostrobothnia and one of the Sub-regions of Finland since 2009.

Municipalities
 Pyhäjoki
 Raahe
 Siikajoki

Politics
Results of the 2018 Finnish presidential election:

 Sauli Niinistö   54.1%
 Paavo Väyrynen   12.2%
 Matti Vanhanen   11.2%
 Laura Huhtasaari   8.0%
 Pekka Haavisto   6.5%
 Merja Kyllönen   5.7%
 Tuula Haatainen   2.1%
 Nils Torvalds   0.2%

Sub-regions of Finland
Geography of North Ostrobothnia